Bianka Panova (born May 27, 1970 in Sofia) is a Bulgarian individual rhythmic gymnast. One of the Golden Girls of Bulgaria that dominated rhythmic gymnastics in the 1980s. She is the 1987 World All-around champion, 1989 World All-around silver medalist, 1985 World All-around bronze medallist and 1986 European All-around champion. She won a total of nine World Championship gold medals.

Personal life 
Panova was born on May 27, 1970 in Sofia, Bulgaria. She lives in Belgium with her husband, physiotherapist and physician, Tchavdar Ninov, and their two sons, Stefan and Richard.

Career 
Panova won the Bulgarian national title three times.

At the age of 15, Panova won her first gold medal at the 1985 World Championships in ribbon. Between 1985 and 1989, she won nine golds, two silvers, and one bronze at the World Championships, including a sweep of all five golds at the 1987 Worlds Championships. Panova competed at the 1988 Seoul Olympics as the reigning World champion. She made a mistake in the preliminary round, dropping a club. She finished in fourth place behind gold medalist Marina Lobatch (USSR), Bulgarian teammate Adriana Dunavska who took the silver medal, and Olexandra Tymoshenko (USSR).

Panova retired from competition in 1989 and became a coach in Italy. She coached the Italian national champion, Katia Pietrosanti, who is the 1993 European Junior silver medalist in clubs.

Panova tried to make a comeback in 1992 but failed to make the Bulgarian Olympic team. She returned to coaching in 1993, this time in Belgium. She concentrated on artistic gymnastics and acrobatics choreography. Until 2001, she was head coach at the Happy Gym club in Ghent, and is responsible for many of Belgium's finest athletes, among them National champion Elke De Backer. She has also introduced her own method of flexibility conditioning for non-gymnast athletes.

In 2009, Panova was invited to compete in the Bulgarian edition of Dancing With The Stars and won with the highest public vote.

Achievements 
Panova is the first rhythmic gymnast to get a clean sweep of all five (All-around, Ribbon, Clubs, Hoop, Rope) gold medals at a World Championship. (The only other gymnasts to win all of the apparatus at a single World Championship are Oxana Kostina and Evgenia Kanaeva.) Panova also became the first rhythmic gymnast to get onto the Guinness Book of Records by her perfect performance of full 10 marks in all her routines (total of 8) at a World Championship and received the trophy personally from the President of the IOC at that time, Juan Antonio Samaranch. She achieved this at the 1987 World Championships in Varna.

External links

NSA Bulgarian gymnasts
https://web.archive.org/web/20110718150059/http://www.gymn.ca/gymnasticgreats/rsg/panova.htm
https://web.archive.org/web/20060513231702/http://lesgymnastesdegr.ifrance.com/pages/44.html (en Français)

1970 births
Living people
Gymnasts from Sofia
Bulgarian rhythmic gymnasts
Bulgarian expatriates in Belgium
Medalists at the Rhythmic Gymnastics World Championships